S. vulgaris may refer to:
 Senecio vulgaris, a tenacious deciduous annual species
 Silene vulgaris, a plant species that looks like a bladder
 Strongylus vulgaris, a common horse parasite species
 Syringa vulgaris, an olive species

See also
 Vulgaris (disambiguation)